Sebastián de Salamanca (died 1526) was a Roman Catholic prelate who served as Bishop of Santiago de Cuba (1525–1526).

Biography
In 1525, Sebastián de Salamanca was appointed during the papacy of Pope Clement VII as Bishop of Santiago de Cuba.
He served as Bishop of Santiago de Cuba until his death in 1526.

References

External links and additional sources
 (for Chronology of Bishops)  
 (for Chronology of Bishops) 

16th-century Roman Catholic bishops in Cuba
Bishops appointed by Pope Clement VII
1526 deaths
Roman Catholic bishops of Santiago de Cuba